Julian Hails (born 20 November 1967) is an English former professional footballer who played in the Football League as a midfielder for Fulham and Southend United. He is a maths teacher at the St Albans High School for Girls.

Biography

Football career
Hails was studying for a maths degree and playing part-time at Hemel Hempstead Town, before being offered a trial at Fulham. Part of the deal that took Hails to Fulham was that he could stay on and finish his degree. He joined Fulham permanently in 1990. He played as a right-winger for Fulham, a position his father used to play for Lincoln City, Peterborough United, Luton Town and Northampton Town. Hails made 126 appearances in all competitions scoring 13 goals, being voted as the "Player of the Season" by Fulham fans during his spell with the London club.

Peter Taylor signed Hails for Southend United in early December 1994. He made 182 appearances for Southend in all competitions scoring seven goals. Hails was moved into right-back position in September 1997, when Alvin Martin took control as the manager. He won the "Player of the Season" award that season after a number of impressive performances. He was forced to retire in 2000, after a two-year struggle with knee injuries.

Life after football
Hails has a BSc honours in Mathematical Studies. He is now a maths teacher at The Haberdashers' Aske's Boys' School, when he joined in May 2006, and has had various football and tennis coaching roles at the school.

Personal life
Hails was born in Lincoln and is married. He now lives with his wife and 3 sons in Hertfordshire. His father, William, was also a professional footballer in the 1950s and 1960s, who played for Lincoln City, Peterborough United, Luton Town and Northampton Town.

References

1967 births
Living people
Sportspeople from Lincoln, England
English footballers
Schoolteachers from Lincolnshire
Hemel Hempstead Town F.C. players
Fulham F.C. players
Southend United F.C. players
English Football League players
Association football midfielders